Clemency is the granting of leniency for a punishment, such as a pardon.

Clemency or Clémency may also refer to:

Places
 Clemency, Luxembourg, a town
Clemency Castle, a castle located in the town of Clemency, Luxembourg 
 Clemency (commune), a former commune in Luxembourg. Now merged into the commune of Käerjeng 
 Matton-et-Clémency, a commune in northern France 
 Clémency (commune), a former commune in northern France now part of the commune Matton-et-Clémency

People
 Clemency Canning, or Charles Canning, 1st Earl Canning (1812–1862), English statesman and Governor-General of India 
 Clemency Burton-Hill (born 1981), English actress, TV/radio presenter, writer etc.
 Clemency Anne Rosemary Gray, or Rose Gray, (1939–2010), British chef and cookery writer

Others
 Clemency (film), a 2019 American film
 Clemency of Titus or La clemenza di Tito, an opera seria in two acts composed by Wolfgang Amadeus Mozart